Shorthill is a small village in Shropshire, England. It is located just off the A488, near to Hanwood and Arscott, within Pontesbury civil parish. Shorthill contains a Victorian red-brick towered church (now closed as place of worship), at Lea Cross.

Villages in Shropshire